The coins of the Cypriot pound are part of the physical form of former Cypriot currency, the Cypriot pound. They have been issued since coming under British rule in 1878, until Cyprus' adoption of Euro in 2008.

Predecimal series

Before 1955, 1 pound was divided into 20 shillings (σελίνι / σελίνια, şilin), and each shilling was divided into 9 piastres (γρόσι / γρόσια, kuruş).

The first coinage was issued by the British in 1879, comprising bronze piastres depicting the head of Queen Victoria on one side and the word 'Cyprus' on the verso. This was subject to some controversy at the time, with questions being asked in the British House of Commons as to the legality of the British government issuing coinage in territory which was still, legally, part of the Ottoman Empire.

 Coins of Queen Victoria (1879–1901): Queen Victoria
 Coins of King Edward VII (1902–08): King Edward VII
 Coins of King George V: King George V
 Coins of King George VI as King and Emperor (1938–47): King George VI
 Coins of King George VI as King only (1949)

Decimal - mils
In 1955, Cyprus decimalized with 1000 mils (μιλς, mil) to the pound. The system was based on a proposal, presented to the British parliament in 1881, to introduce a decimal currency system into the United Kingdom. The political debate on decimalising British coinage had been going on since 1824, but the 1881 motion failed to gain parliamentary approval and so the mil-system was never introduced into the United Kingdom itself. Instead it was used in various British colonial and protectorate territories, including Palestine from 1927, and Cyprus from 1955.

Coins of Queen Elizabeth II (1955–57)

In 1955, the coins of the King George VI issues were withdrawn from circulation. These were replaced by coins with Queen Elizabeth II, denominated in mils. The coins that were issued are the following:

3 mils, 5 mils (also issued in 1956), 25 mils, 50 mils, and 100 mils (also issued in 1957).

The 50 mil coin became known as a 'shilling', because it was the same size as the 1 shilling and 9 piastre coins. The 100 mil coin became known as '2 shillings', because it was the same size as the 2 shilling and 18 piastre coins.  The 5 mil coin and 100 mil coin of 1956 are very sought after by collectors of Commonwealth coins. The 100 mils is very rare.

Coins of the Republic of Cyprus (1963–82)

In 1960, when Cyprus became independent under the terms of the 1959 Independence Agreement, the Queen Elizabeth II coinage was allowed to stay in circulation.

In 1963, the Republic of Cyprus began to issue its first coins. These were struck at the Royal Mint in London. The coins in the 1963 issue consisted of the following:  1 mil, 5 mils, 25 mils, 50 mils, and 100 mils.

From 1970, the issue of 500 mil coins began to be issued. The 1970 500 mil coin was issued to commemorate the F.A.O. and the 25th Anniversary of the United Nations. Other 500 mil coins were issued.

In 1976, a 1-pound coin was issued to commemorate refugees of the 1974 Turkish invasion.

In 1977, a gold 50 pounds was struck as a commemorative at the Royal Mint, Llantrisant. This coin commemorates Archbishop Makarios III, who remained in office as President of Cyprus until his death.

In 1981 and 1982, 5 mil coins were struck with the name 'Cyprus' trilingually inscribed—'Kypros' in Greek, 'Cyprus' in English and 'Kıbrıs' in Turkish.

Archbishop Makarios III Medal-Coins
There were two issues of these pieces. The first issue was struck in 1966 and the second issue was struck in 1974. The obverse of these medal-coins depict the portrait of President-Archbishop Makarios III.

The reverses of these pieces depict the Palaeologus Byzantine double-headed eagle.  These coins are listed in the 2005 edition of the Krause Unusual World Coins catalogue.

Decimal - cents
The subdivision was changed to 100 cents (σεντ, sent) to the pound in 1983, October 3. Coins were introduced for ½, 1, 2, 5, 10 and 20 cents, with the ½ cent the same size and composition as the earlier 5 mil coins. The other coins were struck in nickel-brass. The ½ cent was only struck in 1983. In 1991, cupronickel, seven-sided (reuleaux heptagon) 50 cent coins were introduced.

The last 20 cent coin has a different reverse side than the one shown above. Specifically, it shows the head of Cypriot philosopher Zeno of Citium.

When brand new, the first five coins (1, 2, 5, 10, and 20 cent) have exactly the same bright golden colour and they do not differ as shown on the table above. The 50 cent coin has a rounded heptagonal shape and has a bright silver colour.

See also

 Cypriot euro coins
 Cypriot pound

References

Cypriot pound